The 2015–16 season was AFC Wimbledon's 14th season in their history and 5th consecutive season in League Two. Despite getting the season off to a mediocre start, good spells of form in the latter half of the season ensured that The Dons would confirm their highest ever League Two finish with 7th place and qualification to the 2016 Football League play-offs. AFC Wimbledon went on to beat 4th placed Accrington Stanley 3–2 on aggregate, earning them a place in the play-off Final at Wembley Stadium against Plymouth Argyle. The Dons went on to win the play-off final on 30 May 2016 in front of a crowd of 57,956, earning them promotion to Football League One for the first time in their history.

League table

Results summary

Matches

Pre-season friendlies

League Two

August

September

October

November

December

January

February

March

April

May

League Two play-offs

Semi-final

Final

FA Cup

League Cup

Football League Trophy

London Senior Cup

On 8 February 2016, it was announced that AFC Wimbledon had decided to withdraw from the competition after being unable to agree with Second Round opponents London Bari on a suitable date to play the match after the original fixture had been cancelled on 9 January due to a waterlogged pitch.

Player statistics

League Appearances and goals

|-
|colspan="14"|Players who featured on loan for AFC Wimbledon but subsequently returned to their parent club:

|-
|colspan="14"|Players who left or were released by AFC Wimbledon during the course of the season:

|}

Play-off Appearances

|}

Top scorers

Disciplinary record

Transfers

References

2015-16
AFC Wimbledon